During the American Civil War, Army reorganization created the Department of the Pacific on January 15, 1861.  On December 12, 1861, the District of Humboldt was created, consisting of the counties of Sonoma, Napa, Mendocino, Trinity, Humboldt, Klamath, and Del Norte in Northern California. The district was headquartered at Fort Humboldt, located on a bluff above the central portion of Humboldt Bay south of Eureka, California, which is now a California State Historic Park located within the City of Eureka.  The District's efforts were directed at prosecuting the ongoing Bald Hills War against the Indians in the northern, coastal area of the large district.  A peace was achieved in August 1864.

On July 27, 1865, the Military Division of the Pacific was created, consisting of the Department of California and Department of the Columbia. Humboldt District was absorbed by the Department of California.

Commanders 
 Colonel Francis J. Lippitt, January 9, 1862 - July 13, 1863.
 Lieutenant Colonel Stephen G. Whipple, July 13, 1863 - February, 1864 
 Colonel Henry M. Black February 8, 1864 - June 1864 
 Lieutenant Colonel Stephen G. Whipple, June 1864 - July 27, 1865.

Posts of the Humboldt Military District

References

External links
 Historic Military Posts from the California State Military Museum.

California in the American Civil War
Eureka, California
History of Humboldt County, California
Departments and districts of the United States Army
Union Army departments
Pacific Coast Theater of the American Civil War
Bald Hills War
1861 establishments in California